Jeffrey Szwez (born June 16, 1981) is a Canadian-German professional ice hockey right winger who is currently an unrestricted free agent.

Playing career
Szwez began his career playing for various minor league teams between 2002 and 2009, mainly in the ECHL. He played for the Augusta Lynx, Dayton Bombers, Florence Pride and the Pee Dee Pride. He also played in the American Hockey League for the Binghamton Senators, Bridgeport Sound Tigers, Syracuse Crunch and Philadelphia Phantoms. He also had ten game in the SM-liiga for the Espoo Blues during the 2007-08 SM-liiga season.

In 2009, Szwez signed for the Belfast Giants of the Elite Ice Hockey League and had a standout year, scoring 36 goals in 41 games as he helped the Giants win the Playoff Championship. He also made the league's All-Star Second team. He then moved to the Deutsche Eishockey Liga with the Augsburger Panther the following season, though the move ultimately did not work out for Szwez as he scored just 4 goals in 67 games over two seasons before moving to the Ravensburg Towerstars of the second-tier 2nd Bundesliga in January 2012 and later in the year, Szwez was playing in the third-tier Oberliga for EHC Freiburg.

On August 22, 2013, Szwez returned to the Belfast Giants for a second spell. He was able to recapture the same form he displayed in his previous spell, notching up 32 goals in 51 games and making the EIHL's All-Star Second Team once more. Szwez's second spell in Belfast would just end just like his first did, after one season and moving to the DEL, this time with ERC Ingolstadt. Szwez managed a relatively decent season with Ingolstadt, scoring 9 goals and 9 assists in 38 games, though he was not tendered a new contract and was released to free agency. On September 7, 2015, Szwez belatedly opted to remain in Germany, signing a contract with the Krefeld Pinguine of the DEL where he failed to score a single goal in 20 games and only notched up one assist. Szwez was released by Krefeld and he finished the season with Dresdner Eislöwen of DEL2. On October 13, 2016, Szwez signed for ESV Kaufbeuren of DEL2.

Career statistics

Honours and awards
2007–08 SM-liiga Silver Medal
2009-10 EIHL All-Star Second Team
2009–10 EIHL Playoff Champion
2013–14 EIHL Champion
2013–14 EIHL Erhard Conference Champion
2013–14 EIHL All-Star Second Team

References

External links

1981 births
Augsburger Panther players
Augusta Lynx players
Belfast Giants players
Binghamton Senators players
Bridgeport Sound Tigers players
Canadian ice hockey right wingers
Dayton Bombers players
Dresdner Eislöwen players
Espoo Blues players
ESV Kaufbeuren players
Florence Pride players
EHC Freiburg players
ERC Ingolstadt players
Kitchener Rangers players
Krefeld Pinguine players
Living people
Pee Dee Pride players
Philadelphia Phantoms players
Ravensburg Towerstars players
Sportspeople from Etobicoke
Ice hockey people from Toronto
Syracuse Crunch players
Canadian expatriate ice hockey players in the United States
Canadian expatriate ice hockey players in Finland
Canadian expatriate ice hockey players in Germany
Canadian expatriate ice hockey players in Northern Ireland
Canadian people of German descent